Information governance, or IG, is the overall strategy for information at an organization. Information governance balances the risk that information presents with the value that information provides. Information governance helps with legal compliance, operational transparency, and reducing expenditures associated with legal discovery. An organization can establish a consistent and logical framework for employees to handle data through their information governance policies and procedures. These policies guide proper behavior regarding how organizations and their employees handle information whether it is physically or electronically created (ESI).

Information governance encompasses more than traditional records management.  It incorporates information security and protection, compliance, data quality, data governance, electronic discovery, risk management, privacy, data storage and archiving, knowledge management, business operations and management, audit, analytics, IT management, master data management, enterprise architecture, business intelligence, big data, data science, and finance.

History

Records management
Records management deals with the creation, retention and storage and disposition of records.  A record can either be a physical, tangible object, or digital information such as a database, application data, and e-mail.  The lifecycle was historically viewed as the point of creation to the eventual disposal of a record.  As data generation exploded in recent decades, and regulations and compliance issues increased, traditional records management failed to keep pace.  A more comprehensive platform for managing records and information became necessary to address all phases of the lifecycle, which led to the advent of information governance.

In 2003 the Department of Health in England introduced the concept of broad-based information governance into the National Health Service, publishing version 1 of an online performance assessment tool with supporting guidance. The NHS IG Toolkit is now used by over 30,000 NHS and partner organisations, supported by an e-learning platform with some 650,000 users. In 2010 Logan and Lomas took up the theme of IG more holistically, publishing on how different disciplines needed to come together to better manage information. Lomas produced teaching in this domain, with Smallwood later providing a key textbook in this domain.

Professionally, in this context 2008, ARMA International introduced the Generally Accepted Recordkeeping Principles®, or "The Principles" and in 2015 the subsequent "The Principles" Information Governance Maturity Model. "The Principles" identify the critical hallmarks of information governance. As such, they apply to all sizes of organizations, in all types of industries, and in both the private and public sectors. Multi-national organizations can also use "The Principles" to establish consistent practices across a variety of business units. ARMA International recognized that a clear statement of "Generally Accepted Recordkeeping Principles®" ("The Principles") would guide:

 CEOs in determining how to protect their organizations in the use of information assets;
 Legislators in crafting legislation meant to hold organizations accountable; and
 Records management professionals in designing comprehensive and effective records management programs.

Information governance goes beyond retention and disposition to include privacy, access controls, and other compliance issues.  In electronic discovery, or e-discovery, relevant data in the form of electronically stored information is searched for by attorneys and placed on legal hold.  IG includes consideration of how this data is held and controlled for e-discovery, and also provides a platform for defensible disposition and compliance.  Additionally, metadata often accompanies electronically stored data and can be of great value to the enterprise if stored and managed correctly.

With all of these additional considerations that go beyond traditional records management, IG emerged as a platform for organizations to define policies at the enterprise level, across multiple jurisdictions.  IG then also provides for the enforcement of these policies into the various repositories of information, data, and records.

A coalition of organizations known as Electronic Discovery Reference Model (EDRM), which was founded in 2005 to address issues related to electronic discovery and information governance, subsequently developed, as one of its projects, a resource called the Information Governance Reference Model (IGRM). In 2011, EDRM, in collaboration with ARMA International, published a white paper that describes How the Information Governance Reference Model (IGRM) Complements ARMA International’s Generally Accepted Recordkeeping Principles ("The Principles")  The IGRM illustrates the relationship between key stakeholders and the Information Lifecycle and highlights the transparency required to enable effective governance IGRM v3.0 Update: Privacy & Security Officers As Stakeholders.

In 2012, Compliance, Governance and Oversight Council (CGOC) developed the Information Governance Process Maturity Model, or (IGPMM). The model outlines 13 key processes in electronic discovery (e-discovery) and information management. Each process is described in terms of a maturity level from one to four – completely manual and ad hoc to greater degrees of process integration across functions and automation. In 2017, it was updated to include an emphasis on legal, privacy, information security, cloud security issues and evolving data privacy concerns, including the impact of The General Data Protection Regulation (GDPR)(EU).

Organizational structure
In the past, records managers owned records management, perhaps within a compliance department at an enterprise.  In order to address the broader issues surrounding records management, several other key stakeholders must be involved.  Legal, IT, and Compliance tend to be the departments that touch information governance the most, though certainly other departments might seek representation.  Many enterprises create information governance committees to ensure that all necessary constituents are represented and that all relevant issues are addressed.

Tools
To address retention and disposition, Records Management and Enterprise Content Management applications were developed.  Sometimes detached search engines or homegrown policy definition tools were created.  These were often employed at a departmental or divisional level; rarely were tools used across the enterprise.  While these tools were used to define policies, they lacked the ability to enforce those policies.  Monitoring for compliance with policies was increasingly challenging. Since information governance addresses so much more than traditional records management, several software solutions have emerged to include the vast array of issues facing records managers.

Other available tools include:
 ARMA International Information Governance Implementation Model
 ARMA Generally Accepted Recordkeeping Principles
 CGOC Information Governance Process Maturity Model
 EDRM Information Governance Reference Model (IGRM)
 NHS Information Governance Toolkit

Laws and regulations
Key to IG are the regulations and laws that help to define corporate policies.  Some of these regulations include:

United States
The Foreign Account Tax Compliance Act, or FATCA
Payment Card Industry Data Security Standard, or PCI Compliance
Health Insurance Portability and Accountability Act, or HIPAA
Financial Services Modernization Act of 1999, or Gramm–Leach–Bliley Act (GLBA)
Sarbanes–Oxley Act of 2002, or Sarbox or SOX
Federal Rules of Civil Procedure
California Consumer Privacy Act, or CCPA

European Union
 General Data Protection Regulation
 NIS Directive

United Kingdom
 Data Protection Act 2018
 General Data Protection Regulation - GDPR will be incorporated directly into domestic law immediately after the UK exits the European Union
 NIS Regulations - The EU NIS Directive was transposed into UK law by DCMS, in May 2018 via the NIS regulations.

Guidelines

MoReq2
MoReq2010
ISO 15489 Information and Documentation - Records Management
DoD 5015.2, or Design Criteria Standard for Electronic Records Management Software Applications

See also
Data defined storage
 Data governance
Electronic discovery
Enterprise content management
Information management
Information technology governance
Knowledge management
National archives
Records management

References

External links
 EPA 10 Reasons for RM

 
Content management systems
Public records
Data management